Bologna Guglielmo Marconi Airport  is an international airport serving the city of Bologna in Italy. The airport is named after Bologna native Guglielmo Marconi, an Italian electrical engineer and Nobel laureate.

History
The original Bologna airport was opened in 1933 some 500 metres to the west of the present building. This airport was used until the 1970s, by which time it had become impractically small for passenger numbers and was replaced by the present airport.

Transatlantic routes
In June 2005, Eurofly began flying nonstop from Bologna to New York City using Airbus A330s. The route lasted until 2008. Over a decade later, direct service to the United States resumed. American Airlines introduced a seasonal link to Philadelphia in June 2019. Given Bologna's proximity to Tuscany, the company anticipated that tourists bound for the region would take the flight. However, in August the airline stated that it would not return the following summer, as the financial performance of the route had not met its expectations.

Facilities

Terminal
There is one terminal, which underwent an expansion during 2011–2013. It now covers a total surface 36,100m2, of which 5,500m2 are shopping areas. A new baggage handling system was installed and there are now 24 departure gates, all are bus gates since there are not yet any jetways at the airport.

Runway

Airlines and destinations
The following airlines operate regular scheduled and charter flights at Bologna Airport:

Statistics

Ground transportation

By monorail 

Opened in 2020, the Marconi Express monorail connects the airport to Bologna Centrale railway station with a travel time of approximately 7.5 minutes.

Soon after its inauguration, the service started suffering significant disruptions, culminating with its suspension between November 2021 and February 2022, with surreptitious substitution via normal buses, despite oblivious customers paying the full fare for a service they never received. As of February 2022, the issues persists, and normal buses are still integrating the service.

By car 
Motorways:
 A1 from Milan
 A13 from Padova
 A14 from Ancona

By bus 
A shuttle bus service, route Aerobus (BLQ), used to run between the station and the airport before the advent of Marconi Express. In case of events at the Bologna Fiere trade fair venue, BLQ operated a direct connection between the Airport and the bus terminus Fiera Viale Aldo Moro. Route BLQ has been withdrawn as of 18 November 2020, with the introduction of the Marconi Express

The only TPER bus connections available to and from the airport are routes 54, between the Airport and Borgo Panigale; and 944, between the Airport and the Maggiore Hospital, calling at Via della Birra, Via del Triumvirato, Pontelungo, and Santa Viola. Route 944 is extended to Bologna Centrale railway station in its last two departures at 00.15 and 00.45, while its first two departures from the railway station are at 5.20 and 5.30; due to the people mover being yet to begin service.

From the nearby Via della Birra and Via del Triumvirato, it is possible to board suburban routes (also operated by TPER), 81, 81A, 91 and 91A to Longara, Padulle, Bagno di Piano and Calderara di Reno.

The airport has daily direct bus connections with Ferrara, Florence, Modena, Cervia, Ravenna, and Rimini, and three times a week with Ascoli Piceno.

By train 
The nearest railway station is Calderara-Bargellino railway station, about 4 km from the airport. However, there is no public transport connection between the two.
Passengers coming by rail are expected to change for the Monorail at Bologna Central Station.

See also
List of the busiest airports in Italy
List of airports in Italy

References

External links

 Official website
 

Airports in Italy
Buildings and structures in Bologna
Airport
Guglielmo Marconi